Nová Pec is a municipality and village in Prachatice District in the South Bohemian Region of the Czech Republic. It has about 400 inhabitants.

Administrative parts
Villages of Bělá, Dlouhý Bor, Jelení, Láz, Nové Chalupy and Pěkná are administrative parts of Nová Pec. Pěkná forms an exclave of the municipal territory.

Geography
It is situated on the tripoint of the Czech Republic, Germany and Austria.

Nová Pec lies in the Bohemian Forest mountain range. The peak of Plechý, with  the highest mountain of the Czech and Austrian parts of the mountain range, is located on the Czech-Austrian border. Most of the built-up area is located in the eastern part of the municipality on the banks of the Vltava River. The confluence of the rivers Studená Vltava and Teplá Vltava, which form the Vltava, is located in the territory of the Pěkná exclave.

History
The village was founded in the mid-17th century. The first written mention of Nová Pec is from 1653, when there were two inhabitants registered. It was owned by the Eggenberg family, who acquired the area from Emperor Rudolf II in 1622. After the last member of the family died, Nová Pec was inherited by the House of Schwarzenberg in 1719.

Transport
Nová Pec lies on the railway line of local importance from České Budějovice to Stožec.

References

External links

Villages in Prachatice District
Bohemian Forest